Talisa is a female given name. Notable people with the name include

People
Talisa Lanoe (born 1994), Kenyan swimmer
Talisa Soto (born 1967), American actress
Talisa Thomalla (born 2003), German skater
Talisa Torretti (born 2003), Italian gymnast

Fictional characters
Talisa Maegyr, Game of Thrones character

See also

Feminine given names